Andy Quirke is an Irish actor and producer best known for his dual performance in Damo and Ivor.

Biography
Andy's father is businessman Richard Quirk. He has a brother, model Wesley Quirke, the husband of 2003 Miss World, Rosanna Davison.

Filmography

References

External links
 

Irish male comedians
Irish male actors
Irish television producers
Irish film producers
21st-century Irish comedians
Irish sketch comedians